Elizabeth Bisland Wetmore (February 11, 1861 – January 6, 1929) was an American journalist and author, perhaps now best known for her 1889–1890 race around the world against Nellie Bly, which drew worldwide attention. The majority of her writings were literary works. She published all of her works as Elizabeth Bisland.

Early career

Bisland was born on Fairfax Plantation, St. Mary Parish, Louisiana, on February 11, 1861.  During the Civil War, the family fled the homestead prior to the Battle of Fort Bisland. Life was difficult when they returned, and when she was twelve the family moved to Natchez, Louisiana, site of her father's family home that he had inherited.

She began her writing career as a teenager, sending poetry to the New Orleans Times Democrat using the pen name B. L. R. Dane. Once her writing activity was revealed to her family and the editor of the paper, she was paid for the work, and she soon went to New Orleans to work for the paper.

Around 1887, Bisland moved to New York City and got her first work from The Sun newspaper. By 1889 she was doing work for a number of publications, including the New York World. Among other outlets, she later become an editor at Cosmopolitan magazine and she also contributed to the Atlantic Monthly and the North American Review.

Journey around the world

In November 1889, the New York World announced that it was sending its reporter Nellie Bly around the world, in a bid to beat Phileas Fogg's fictitious 80-day journey in Jules Verne's novel Around the World in Eighty Days. Catching wind of this publicity stunt, John Brisben Walker, who had just purchased the three-year-old and still-fledgling Cosmopolitan, decided to dispatch Bisland on her own journey.

Ultimately, however, Bly triumphed over Bisland. Critically, while in England, Bisland was told (and apparently believed) she had missed her intended ride, the swift German steamer Ems leaving from Southampton, even though her publisher had bribed the shipping company to delay its departure. It is unknown whether she was intentionally deceived.<ref name="marks1">Abrams, Alan. Gold among the summer's dross, Toledo Blade, September 5, 1993</ref> She was thus forced to catch the slow-going Bothnia on January 18, departing from Queenstown (Cobh), Ireland, ensuring that Bly would prevail.Arrival of Elizabeth Bisland:  Although Beaten by Neille Bly She Succeeds in Lowering Phiness Fogg's Record, Chicago Tribune, January 31, 1890Woman Against Woman: "Nellie Bly" and Miss Bisland go racing around the world, Aurora Daily Express, November 27, 1889

Bisland's ship did not arrive in Manhattan until January 30. She completed her trip in 76 days, also well ahead of Fogg's fictional record. Bisland wrote a series of articles for the Cosmopolitan on her journey, subsequently published as a book entitled, In Seven Stages: A Flying Trip Around The World (1891).Marks, Jason. Around the World in 72 Days: The race between Pulitzer's Nellie Bly and Cosmopolitan's Elizabeth Bisland (Gemittarius Press 1993)

Later career
Bisland's writing was of a more literary nature than her participation in the world race might indicate (and her writings were a clear contrast from the more swashbuckling style of Bly's writings on her trip). Indeed, her 1929 New York Times obituary failed to even mention the journey, and she focused her writing on more serious topics after "the race". In 1906, she published the well-received The Life and Letters of Lafcadio Hearn; she had first met Hearn when both were living in New Orleans in the 1880s.

She co-wrote with Anne Hoyt Seekers in Sicily, which was written before, but published after, the 1908 Messina earthquake.

Bisland's final book, Three Wise Men of the East (1930), was published posthumously.

Personal life
Bisland married lawyer Charles Whitman Wetmore in 1891, (stating that Wetmore graduated from Harvard in 1875; other records show he obtained an L.L.B. as well in 1877) however, she continued to publish books under her maiden name. The couple constructed a noted summer residence called Applegarth (on Long Island's North Shore) in 1892.Goodman, Matthew, Elizabeth Bisland's Race Around the World, The Public Domain Review, October 16, 2013 with image of Applegarth

Bisland died of pneumonia near Charlottesville, Virginia on January 6, 1929, and was buried at Woodlawn Cemetery in The Bronx, New York City, coincidentally, in the same cemetery as Bly, who also died of pneumonia in 1922.

Selected bibliography

 In Seven Stages: A Flying Trip Around the World, New York: Harper and Brothers, 1891
 The Secret Life: Being the Book of a Heretic (1906)
 The Life and Letters of Lafcadio Hearn (1906)
 Three Wise Men of the East (1930)

In popular culture 
Although Bisland is far less remembered than Bly, the race between the two has been the subject of two works of popular history and one musical theatre production:

 Goodman, Matthew (October 2013). "Elizabeth Bisland's Race Around the World". Public Domain Review.
 Marks, Jason. Around the World in 72 Days: The race between Pulitzer's Nellie Bly and Cosmopolitan's Elizabeth Bisland (Gemittarius Press 1993)
DiFabbio, Marialena and Jones, Susannah. Bisland and Bly''.  Sycamore Theatre Company, 2018.

References

External links

 In Seven Stages: A Flying Trip Around the World New York: Harper and Brothers, 1891 at A Celebration of Women Writers
 
 
 

1861 births
1929 deaths
Deaths from pneumonia in Virginia
People from St. Mary Parish, Louisiana
19th-century American journalists
American women journalists
Writers from Louisiana
Journalists from Louisiana
Writers from New York City
19th-century American women writers
Burials at Woodlawn Cemetery (Bronx, New York)
People born in the Confederate States